Sphaerobothria is a monotypic genus of Central American tarantulas containing the single species, Sphaerobothria hoffmanni. It was first described by Ferdinand Anton Franz Karsch in 1879, and is found in Panama and Costa Rica.

See also
 List of Theraphosidae species

References

Monotypic Theraphosidae genera
Spiders of Central America
Taxa named by Ferdinand Karsch
Theraphosidae